The 2021 Four Nationals Figure Skating Championships were held from 10 to 12 December 2020 in Cieszyn, Poland. It served as the national championships for the Czech Republic, Poland, and Slovakia; traditionally, Hungary has also participated. Hungary not participated in this year, but organized an own National Championship at Budapest from 18 to 18 December. The three highest-placing skaters from each country formed their national podiums, after the competition results were split. Medals were awarded in men's singles, ladies' singles, pair skating, and ice dance on the senior and junior levels. Due to the COVID-19 pandemic, several skaters training abroad competed virtually via video submissions. The results were among the criteria used by each national federation to determine international assignments.

Medals summary

Senior

Junior

Senior results

Men 
Michal Březina of the Czech Republic, who trains in the United States, competed virtually.

Ladies

Pairs

Ice dance 
Jenna Hertenstein / Damian Binkowski of Poland, who train in the United States, competed virtually.

Junior results

Pairs

Ice dance 
Olivia Oliver / Joshua Andari of Poland, who train in Canada, competed virtually.

References

External links 
 2021 Four National Championships Results 

Four National Figure Skating
International figure skating competitions hosted by Poland
Four National Figure Skating Championships
Four National Figure Skating Championships
Four National Figure Skating Championships
Four National Figure Skating Championships
Czech Figure Skating Championships
Polish Figure Skating Championships
Slovak Figure Skating Championships